Pim Bouwman (born 30 January 1991) is a Dutch professional footballer who plays a midfielder for Cappellen.

Club career
Born in Oost-Souburg, he made his senior debut for NAC during the 2010–11 season. He moved to Finnish club Inter Turku in January 2012.

He left Enosis Neon Paralimni after the club was relegated and subsequently moved to Ermis Aradippou in July 2016.

Bouwman signed with Cappellen on 17 December 2018. In July 2019, Bouwman returned to Cyprus and joined Othellos Athienou FC. He returned to Cappellen after one season. On 22 March 2021, he agreed on a contract with RKSV Halsteren in the Hoofdklasse, joining them ahead of the 2021–22 season.

References

1991 births
Living people
Sportspeople from Vlissingen
Association football midfielders
Dutch footballers
NAC Breda players
FC Inter Turku players
Enosis Neon Paralimni FC players
Ermis Aradippou FC players
Royal Cappellen F.C. players
Othellos Athienou F.C. players
Eredivisie players
Veikkausliiga players
Cypriot First Division players
Cypriot Second Division players
Dutch expatriate footballers
Expatriate footballers in Finland
Expatriate footballers in Cyprus
Expatriate footballers in Belgium
Dutch expatriate sportspeople in Finland
Dutch expatriate sportspeople in Cyprus
Dutch expatriate sportspeople in Belgium
Footballers from Zeeland
RKSV Halsteren players